During the 1993–94 English football season, Chelsea F.C. competed in the second season of the FA Premier League.

Season summary
The appointment of Glenn Hoddle as Chelsea's new player-manager was awaited with much optimism for the new season, as previous managers had not been able to secure anything better than mid-table finishes in the three previous seasons. However, as the 1993–94 season lagged away, it looked as though Hoddle's appointment had done little to boost Chelsea's mediocre fortunes as they hovered around the middle of the Premier League. In the end, they finished 14th - three places lower than last season, but an appearance in the FA Cup final meant that they would be qualifying for the European Cup Winners' Cup whether they won or not, as their opponents Manchester United had already won the Premier League title and qualified for the European Cup.

As the players entered the dressing rooms for half-time at Wembley, the scoreline was 0–0, but Chelsea's dream was shattered in the second half as United scored four goals to win 4–0, but at least Chelsea would be playing in Europe next season for the first time in over 20 years. The wait for a major trophy, however, entered its 24th season.

Striker Mark Stein was added to the squad in mid-season, and quickly proved himself to be a competent Premier League goalscorer after impressing in the lower leagues. Pre-season signings Gavin Peacock was also impressive.

Hoddle bolstered his squad for 1994–95 by signing David Rocastle from Manchester City in a bid to strengthen the midfield following Andy Townsend's mid-season move to Aston Villa.

Final league table

Results
Chelsea's score comes first

Legend

FA Premier League

FA Cup

4 Barnet's home tie against Chelsea was switched to Stamford Bridge under police advice and instruction from Barnet.

League Cup

First-team squad
Squad at end of season

Left club during season

References

Chelsea F.C. seasons
Chelsea